Smithfield Presbyterian Church is a historic Presbyterian church located near Amenia, Dutchess County, New York.  It was built about 1847–1848, and is a one-story, Greek Revival style heavy timber frame church sheathed in clapboard.  It has a stone foundation and gable roof and features a tetrastyle portico supported by four Ionic order columns. The church was refurbished in 1938. Also on the property is a contributing horse shed, Sexton's House (1857), and church cemetery, with the earliest grave dated to 1737.  George Whitefield (1714-1770) preached an open air revival sermon at the church in June 1770.

It was added to the National Register of Historic Places in 2012.

References

External links
church website

Presbyterian churches in New York (state)
Churches on the National Register of Historic Places in New York (state)
Greek Revival church buildings in New York (state)
Churches completed in 1848
1737 establishments in the Province of New York
Churches in Dutchess County, New York
National Register of Historic Places in Dutchess County, New York